Richard Leigh Cruess,  (born December 17, 1929) is a Canadian orthopaedic surgeon and academic.

Born in London, Ontario, he received his Bachelor of Arts degree from Princeton University in 1951 and his Doctor of Medicine degree from the Columbia University College of Physicians and Surgeons in 1955. From 1955 to 1962, he did his internship and residency at the Royal Victoria Hospital in Montreal and at the New York Orthopaedic Hospital of Columbia-Presbyterian Medical Center. From 1957 to 1959, he served with the Navy Medical Corps of U.S. Naval Reserve with a rank of Lieutenant.

From 1963 to 1968, he was the attending Orthopaedic Surgeon at the Royal Victoria Hospital and from 1968 to 1981 was the Orthopaedic Surgeon-in-Charge. From 1979 to 1981, he was the Assistant Surgeon-in-Chief. From 1970 to 1982, he was also the Surgeon-in-Chief at the Shriners Hospital for Children – Canada in Montreal.

From 1981 to 1995, he was the Dean of the McGill University Faculty of Medicine.

In 1994, he was made a Member of the Order of Canada; he was promoted to Officer in 1999 and to Companion in 2014. In 2003, he was made an Officer of the National Order of Quebec. In 1985, he was made a Fellow of the Royal Society of Canada. In 2004, he received an honorary degree from Université Laval.

He is married to Sylvia Cruess, an endocrinologist.

References
 

1929 births
Living people
Canadian orthopedic surgeons
Canadian university and college faculty deans
Columbia University Vagelos College of Physicians and Surgeons alumni
Fellows of the Royal Society of Canada
Academic staff of McGill University
Officers of the National Order of Quebec
Companions of the Order of Canada
People from London, Ontario
Princeton University alumni
Anglophone Quebec people
United States Navy Medical Corps officers
Canadian expatriates in the United States